Garage Gold is a television series airing on the DIY Network. The show follows Kraig Bantle and his family-owned business Garage Brothers out of Raleigh, North Carolina, which offers to clean out any garage, basement, or other space free of charge, so long as they can keep and sell any valuables they find in the process. When they're finished, they turn the garage into a usable work space for their client.

The Team

Kraig Bantle - Boss, Brains, and the owner of Garage Brothers
Mike Gleisinger - Appraiser
"Captain" Ron - Mechanic & Heavy Lifter 
Tony - The Muscle (Heavy Lifter)

References

External links

2013 American television series debuts
2017 American television series endings
2010s American reality television series